Scottish cuisine encompasses the cooking styles, traditions and recipes associated with Scotland. It has distinctive attributes and recipes of its own, but also shares much with British and wider European cuisine as a result of local, regional, and continental influences—both ancient and modern.

Scotland's natural larder of vegetables, fruit, oats, fish and other seafood, dairy products and game is the chief factor in traditional Scottish cooking, with a high reliance on simplicity, without the use of rare, and historically expensive, spices found abroad.

History 

Scotland, with its temperate climate and abundance of indigenous game species, has provided food for its inhabitants for millennia. The wealth of seafood available on and off the coasts provided the earliest settlers with sustenance. Agriculture was introduced, and primitive oats quickly became the staple.

Medieval 

From the journeyman down to the lowest cottar, meat was an expensive commodity, and would be consumed rarely. For the lower echelons of mediaeval Scots, it was the products of their animals rather than the beasts themselves which provided nourishment.

This is evident today in traditional Scots fare, with its emphasis on dairy produce. A typical meal in medieval Scotland consisted of a pottage of herbs and roots (and when available some meat, usually seafood, or stock for flavouring), with bread and eggs, cheese or kelp when possible. 

Scotland was a feudal state for the greater part of the second millennium. This put certain restrictions on what one was allowed to hunt, therefore to eat. In the halls of the great men of the realm, one could expect venison, boar, various fowl and songbirds, expensive spices (pepper, cloves, cinnamon, etc.), and the meats of domesticated species.

Before Sir Walter Raleigh's introduction of the potato to the British Isles, the Scots' main source of carbohydrate was bread made from oats or barley. Wheat was generally difficult to grow because of the damp climate. Food thrift was evident from the earliest times, with excavated middens displaying little evidence of anything but the toughest bones. All parts of an animal were used.

The mobile nature of Scots society required food that should not spoil quickly. It was common to carry a small bag of oatmeal that could be transformed into a basic porridge or oatcakes using a girdle (griddle). It is thought that Scotland's national dish, haggis, originated in a similar way: A small amount of offal or low-quality meat, carried in the most inexpensive bag available, a sheep or pig's stomach. It has also been suggested that this dish was introduced by Norse invaders who were attempting to preserve their food during the long journey from Scandinavia.

Early Modern period

During the Early Modern period, French cuisine played a role in Scottish cookery due to cultural exchanges brought about by the "Auld Alliance". When Mary, Queen of Scots returned to Scotland, she brought an entourage of French staff who  revolutionised Scots cooking and created some of Scotland's unique food terminology. These terms include Ashet (assiette), a large platter; Cannel (cannelle), cinnamon; Collop (escalope); Gigot, French for a leg of mutton; Howtowdie (hétoudeau), a boiling fowl in Old French; Syboe (ciboule), spring onion.

18th and 19th centuries 

With the growth of sporting estates and the advent of land enclosure in the 18th century, harvesting Scotland's larder became an industry. The railways further expanded the scope of the market, with Scots grouse at a premium (as today) on English menus shortly after the Glorious Twelfth.

In the 19th century, Charlotte, Lady Clark of Tillypronie collected recipes throughout her life by asking society hostesses or cooks, and then testing them for herself at Tillypronie (Aberdeenshire). These were published posthumously in 1909 as The Cookery Book of Lady Clark of Tillypronie.

20th and 21st centuries

The availability of certain foodstuffs in Scotland, in common with the other parts of the United Kingdom, suffered during the 20th century. Rationing during the two World Wars, as well as large-scale industrial agriculture, limited the diversity of food available to the public. Imports from the British Empire and beyond did, however, introduce new foods to the Scottish public.

During the 19th and 20th centuries there was large-scale immigration to Scotland from Italy, and later from the Middle East, India, and Pakistan. These cultures have influenced Scots cooking dramatically. The Italians reintroduced the standard of fresh produce, and the later comers introduced spice. With the enlargement of the European Union in the early years of the 21st century, there has been an increase in the population of Eastern European descent, from Poland in particular. A number of speciality restaurants and delicatessens catering for the various new immigrants have opened in the larger towns and cities.

Dishes and foods

These dishes and foods are traditional to or originate in Scotland.

Cereals

 Brose—an uncooked porridge
 Porridge
 Sowans—a sour oat porridge
 Skirlie—oatmeal fried with fat, onions and seasonings

Soups

 Cullen skink—a thick soup made of smoked haddock, potato and onion
 Baud bree—hare broth
 Cock-a-leekie soup—leeks, peppered chicken stock, often with rice or barley
 Game soup
 Hairst bree (or hotch potch)—one-pot dish, usually with lamb or mutton, seasonal vegetables
 Partan bree—seafood soup with crab and rice
 Powsowdie—a Scottish sheep's heid (head) broth or soup
 Scotch broth—soup with barley, lamb or mutton, and root vegetables

Fish and seafood

 Arbroath smokies—a type of smoked haddock, a speciality of the town of Arbroath in Angus
 Cabbie claw (cabelew)—young cod in white sauce with chopped egg white
 Crappit heid—fish head stuffed with oats, suet and liver
 Eyemouth pale—cold-smoked haddock with light golden hue, subtle smoke flavour
 Finnan haddie—another cold-smoked haddock 
 Kippers—a whole herring butterflied, salted or pickled, and cold-smoked 
 Kedgeree—rice, smoked haddock, eggs, parsley, butter or cream
 Rollmops—pickled herring, rolled up with onion, gherkin or green olive, with pimento (on a stick)
 Smoked salmon
 Tatties and herring
 Fish and chips—fried fish in crispy batter, served with chips.

Meat, poultry and game

 Ayrshire bacon—specially cured
 Black pudding, red pudding and white pudding——savoury puddings, variously of meat, fat and cereal
 Boiled gigot—leg of mutton or lamb
 Forfar bridie—meat and onion filled pastry
 Chicken tikka masala—roasted marinated chicken in curry 
 Collops—escalope, thick slice of meat off the bone cut across the grain
 Haggis—a savoury pudding containing sheep's pluck (heart, liver and lungs) and several other ingredients
 Howtowdie with Drappit eggs—young hen with poached eggs
 Kilmeny Kail—rabbit, bacon, greens
 Mince and tatties—minced beef, potatoes, onions, often carrots 
 Mutton ham—lamb ham
 Pottit heid (brawn)—head cheese
 Potted hough—another head cheese
 Reestit mutton—salted meat
 Roast Aberdeen Angus beef
 Roast haunch of venison
 Roast grouse
 Roast woodcock/snipe
 Solan goose or guga (gannet) in the Western Isles
 Scotch pie—double-crust meat pie, usually mutton
 Lorne sausage—sausage meat, not encased, mostly served for breakfast
 Stovies—slow-stewed potatoes, often onions and meat

Vegetables

 Clapshot—potatoes, swedes, chives, butter
 Curly kail
 Neeps and tatties (swede turnip and potatoes)
 Rumbledethumps—a traditional dish from the Scottish Borders with main ingredients of potato, cabbage and onion

Fruits

 Blaeberries—not  identical to US blueberries, cf.
 Raspberries
 Slaes
 Strawberries
 Tayberries

Dairy

 Bishop Kennedy—soft, round, brie-like cheese with a yellowish runny interior
 Bonchester—soft cheese with a white rind
 Caboc—cream cheese
 Crowdie—soft, fresh cows' milk cheese
 Dunlop cheese—originating in Dunlop in East Ayrshire
 Gigha—a Dunlop-style cheese, long-produced on the isle of Gigha
 Lanark Blue—a rich, blue-veined artisan sheep's milk cheese
 Teviotdale cheese—full-fat, hard, cows’ milk cheese

Puddings and desserts

 Apple frushie (variant of apple tart)
 Burnt cream, also known as Crème brûlée or Trinity cream. 
 Blaeberry pie
 Carrageen moss—a milk pudding thickened with seaweed
 Clootie dumpling—pudding made with flour, breadcrumbs, dried fruit
 Cranachan—cream,  raspberries, oats and whisky
 Hatted kit—milk pudding
Marmalade pudding—made with stale bread, dried fruit, marmalade, milk and eggs
 Stapag, Fuarag-oats with cold water and cold milk respectively
 Tipsy laird—trifle made with whisky or Drambuie, custard and raspberries

Cakes, breads and confectionery
 Bannock—flat quick bread
 Berwick cockles—white-coloured sweet with red stripes
 Black bun—fruit cake completely covered with pastry
 Butteries/Rowies—savoury bread roll
 Caramel shortbread—with caramel, milk chocolate
 Deep-fried Mars bar
 Drop scones—form of pancake
 Dundee cake—a fruit cake with a rich flavour
 Edinburgh rock—soft and  crumbly confection
 Empire biscuit— two shortbread biscuits with jam between, white icing, cherry on top
 Fatty cutties—girdle cake
 Festy cock—oatmeal pancake
 Fruit slice or Flies' graveyard—sweet pastries with currants or raisins
 Granny sookers—sour, hard, boiled sweet or a peppermint sweet, also known as a pan drop
 Hawick balls—peppermint-flavoured boiled sweet
 Jethart Snails—boiled sweets in the shape of a snail
 Lucky tatties—white fondant with cassia, covered with cinnamon
 Moffat toffee—notable for its tangy but sweet centre
 Morning rolls—airy, chewy bread roll
 Oatcakes—flatbread similar to a cracker, biscuit, or pancake
 Pan drops—white round boiled sweet, hard shell, soft middle
 Pan loaf—bread loaf baked in a pan or tin
 Petticoat tails—form of shortbread 
 Strippit baws—aniseed flavoured hard boiled sweet
 Plain loaf—formerly and traditionally the most common form of bread
 Puff candy—sugary toffee with a light, rigid, sponge-like texture
 Scones
 Scots crumpets—broadly similar to the pikelet
 Scottish macaroon—made with a paste of potato and sugar, and often chocolate
 Selkirk bannock, variations include Yetholm bannock—types of flat quick bread
 Shortbread — biscuit usually made from sugar, butter, and wheat flour
 Soor plooms—sharp-flavoured, round, green boiled sweet
 Tablet—a medium-hard, sugary confection
 Tattie scone (potato scone)—regional variant of the savoury griddle scone
 Well-fired rolls—a more strongly flavoured morning roll

Preserves and spreads

 Dundee Marmalade
 Rowan jelly
 Heather honey

Drinks

Alcoholic

 90 shilling ale, 80 shilling ale, 70 shilling ale
 India pale ale
 Atholl Brose – prepared using oatmeal brose, honey, whisky, and sometimes cream (particularly on festive occasions)
 Crabbie's
 Drambuie
 Ginger wine
 Het pint—hot spiced ale to which sugar, eggs and spirits may be added
 Heather ale—ale flavoured with young heather tops
 Scotch ale 
 Scotch mist – a cocktail containing mainly Scotch whisky
 Scotch whisky

Non-alcoholic

 Breakfast tea
 Irn-Bru—bright orange carbonated soft drink
 Red Kola—bright red carbonated soft drink
 Sugarelly

Restaurants

In recent years Haggis pakoras have become popular in Indian restaurants.

Fast food

Scotland's reputation for coronary and related diet-based diseases is a result of the wide consumption of fast food since the latter part of the 20th century. Fish and chip shops remain extremely popular, and indeed the battered and fried haggis supper remains a favourite. In the area around Edinburgh, the most popular condiment for chip shop meals is "salt and sauce", the sauce element consisting of brown sauce thinned with water and vinegar. However in Glasgow, and elsewhere, chippy sauce is unknown and ketchup or salt and vinegar are preferred, prompting light-hearted debate on the merits of the options among the cities' residents, who tend to find the alternative a baffling concept.

Outlets selling pizzas, kebabs, pakoras and other convenience foodstuffs have also become increasingly popular, with an extreme example of this style of food being the Munchy box.

In addition to independent fast-food outlets, in the 1960s American-style burger bars and other restaurants such as Wimpy were introduced, and in the 1980s, McDonald's, Burger King, Pizza Hut and Kentucky Fried Chicken appeared in Scotland, followed by a large number of Subway franchises in the early 21st century. Branches of Greggs offering cakes, pastries and sandwiches are also very commonly found on the high streets of Scotland, often alongside smaller competing bakeries.

Chefs

 Andrew Fairlie
 Tom Kitchin
 Tom Lewis
 Angela Malik
 Alan Murchison
 Nick Nairn
 Gordon Ramsay
 Mark Greenaway
 Gary Maclean
 Tony Singh
 William Curley
 James Morton

See also

 List of British desserts
 List of restaurants in Scotland
 Food and the Scottish royal household

Notes and references

Further reading

 Beckwith, Lillian (1976) Lillian Beckwith's Hebridean Cookbook. London: Hutchinson 
 Craig, Elizabeth (1956) The Scottish Cookery Book
 --do.-- (1965) What's Cooking in Scotland
 --do.-- (1980) The Scottish Cookery Book
 Frere, Catherine Frances (editor). (1909) The Cookery Book of Lady Clark of Tillypronie. London: Constable and Company.

External links

Scottish Food – Scottish Food & Drink